The Shu School of Qin Music (蜀派古琴) refers to the modern guqin regional performance style tradition and lineage begun in the mid-19th century by its founder, Zhang Kongshan. The "Shu" name derives from the main base of operations at the time, namely the Sichuan region of China. Today, the Shu School has many branches and lineages, most of which trace their foundation to Zhang Kongshan, though the term is equally applied to Sichuan-based players in general.

History
The Sichuan qin players, as early as the Tang Dynasty, was perceived as having qin play characterised by rushing, tumbling energy.

Zhang Kongshan
The modern form of the school was largely founded by Zhang Kongshan in the mid-19th century; his inheritors have been very numerous.

As the Sichuan style fanned out into other areas of China (as it seemed to do rather successfully in the early 20th century), it became known as "Fanchuan", whose connotation is something like "Chuan – Everywhere".

Name nomenclature
There is a debate as to whether the "Shu" (蜀) appellation is an accurate designation for the school/style in question. Some people prefer "Chuan" (川) as this distinguishes it from the old historical "Shu School" which is totally unrelated to the modern guise. "Fanchuan" (泛川) gained credence after being coined by Zha Fuxi and is applied generally to any Shu style player not residing in Sichuan but has generally been applied indiscriminately, even to players with little association or connection with Sichuan or the modern Shu School in general.

Presently, the only players to use the "Shu" appellation are from the main branches of the Zhang Kongshan lineage, especially the Ye branch, e.g. Zeng Chengwei. "Chuan" is generally used by players not of the main Zhang Kongshan lineage but residing roughly in the Sichuan area or have connections with it.

Style
Historically, the Shu style is described in literature as "restlessly fast and unrestrained, with magnificence of momentum". This is due to the nature of the environment which Sichuan is, with high mountains, deep valleys and fast flowing rivers, which are the main influences for the players and composers of the music.

Melodies and Qinpu
The magnum opus and foundation document of the modern Shu School is the Tianwen Ge Qinpu (天聞閣琴譜, "Qin Codex of the Pavilion of Heavenly Sounds"), published in 1876 under the auspices of Zhang Kongshan and his associate, Tang Yiming, and his student, Ye Jiefu. The Tianwen Ge is not only the largest collection of qin melodies ever published in a single publication currently in existence but also it contains many other useful data related to qin lore and construction. Most of the melodies were in the active repertoire of his students and came from many sources. Some were compositions whilst around nine melodies were edited and rearranged by Zhang during his years in Sichuan. Out of these nine, the most influential melody was that of "Liu Shui" (流水) or "Flowing Water".

Branches
There are two branches: one branch through Ye Jiafu whose lineage is embodied by Zeng Chengwei, and the other is through Gu Yucheng whose lineage was embodied by Gu Meigeng. Other than those two main branches, there are others such as the "Ba Lineage" which is not a direct line from Zhang Kongshan.

Lineage tree
Below is a construction of the lines and branches from the transmission of Zhang Kongshan. Due to limitations of space and lack of information, not all transmitters are included.

Notes

References
 Zhang, Huaying (2005), Guqin. 章華英《古琴》
 Wu, Zhao (2005), Clear Sounds of the Peerless. 吳釗《絕世清音》
 Yang, Xiao (ed.), et al. (2013), Oral Histories of Qin People within the Shu Region. 楊曉《蜀中琴人口述史》
 Tang, Liuzhong (ed.), et al. (2013), Magnificence of the Guqin. 唐六中《古琴清英》
 Zeng, Chengwei (ed.), et al. (2014), Qin Journal of Mount Shu. 曾成偉《蜀山琴滙》
 Li, Songlan (2015), The Time-and-Space Penetrating Guqin Art - Research into the Historical and Modern Shu School. 李松蘭《穿越時空的古琴藝術•蜀派歷史與現壯研究》

 
Chinese musical instruments
Early musical instruments
Masterpieces of the Oral and Intangible Heritage of Humanity
Zithers